Shi Lu (1919–1982), born Feng Yaheng, was a Chinese painter, wood block printer, poet and calligrapher. He based his pseudonym on two artists who greatly influenced him, the landscape painter Shitao and writer Lu Xun.

Life and art 

Shi Lu came from a wealthy land owning family in Renshou County, Sichuan Province. A student of the Chinese traditional painting style guohua, he studied at Dongfang Art College and West China Union University in Chengdu (1934-1940). He joined the Communist Party of China and in 1949 at the first national assembly was elected and executive member of the China Artists Association.

In 1955 Shi Lu travelled to India to supervise the overall art design of a Chinese pavilion at an international expo. In 1956 he attended the Asian-African National Art Exhibition in Egypt. During these travels he made many sketches of the people he observed developing his technique of Western drawing and Chinese brushwork.

In 1959 he was commissioned to produce a large scale painting to be displayed in the Great Hall of the People in Beijing to commemorate the 10th anniversary of the forming of the People's Republic of China.

Major works 

 Fighting in Northern Shaanxi

References

Sources

External links 
 http://www.artnet.com/artists/shi-lu/biography
 https://blog.tepapa.govt.nz/2014/05/28/shi-lu-the-literatus-vs-the-revolutionary/
 https://www.rnz.co.nz/national/programmes/voices/galleries/shi-lu
 http://arthistoryreference.com/a1/51726.htm

Republic of China painters
Painters from Sichuan
1919 births
1982 deaths
People from Meishan